Katherine Thompson may refer to:

 Katherine Rawls (1918–1982), American swimmer also known as Katherine Thompson
 Kate Thompson (author) (born 1956), British author of children's fantasy novels
 Katherine J. Thompson, American census statistician

See also
 Katherine Thomson (disambiguation)
 Kathryn Thomson (born 1996), British short track speed skater